Ha!: TV Comedy Network (commonly known as Ha!) was a short-lived American pay television channel owned by Viacom; it was one of the first American all-comedy channels available in basic-tier television offers. Launched on April 1, 1990, at 7 p.m. ET, it competed with another startup comedy-oriented cable channel, HBO-owned The Comedy Channel.  In 1991, the two channels merged to form Comedy Central.

Background 
MTV Networks had carved out a niche for itself in the cable programming marketplace throughout the 1980s with its flagship networks MTV and Nickelodeon. Up until that point, there had been only one instance of competition among genres in the cable industry, that of Ted Turner launching a rival to MTV, Cable Music Channel, which ended up being short-lived and Viacom using the channel space for an older-skewing counterpart to MTV, VH1. At the same time though, research constantly encouraged management that a channel strictly dedicated to comedy programming would be profitable, motivating MTV to forge ahead with plans for a comedy channel. When HBO announced the launch of The Comedy Channel, MTV Networks retaliated by announcing the debut of its own rival channel, Ha!

Programming 
Unlike The Comedy Channel, which focused on stand-up comedy specials and clips of classic comedy feature films, Ha!'s programming centered largely on acquired off-network situation comedies from the 1950s to the 1970s. Some cable providers, particularly those owned by Viacom or Cablevision, carried the channel under a channel-share agreement in which it would be aired on the same channel space as fellow Viacom-owned cable network VH1; Ha! would air for half of the day, with the channel turning over to VH1 afterward.  Programing included Caesar's Hour, in half-hour segments with Sid Caesar intros, The Steve Allen Show, also edited to a half-hour format with 1990 reflections taped by Allen, You Bet Your Life, The Jack Benny Program, the 1960–67 CBS network prime time version of Candid Camera, The Phil Silvers Show, and Car 54, Where Are You?.

The channel name was culled by MTV Networks from a list of 400 possible suggestions by branding agency Fred/Alan, Inc., New York, whose creative team created the logo, branding, advertising, and was the primary consultant on the on-air promotion. As with other channels owned by MTV Networks, the logo was designed in an approach that gave it many variations, each with a different illustrative approach.

Towards the end of 1990, with costs on both sides of the competitive equation struggling to meet the limited needs of cable systems' even limited capacity, HBO and Viacom agreed to merge their respective comedy channels. Ha! and Comedy Channel would combine to create CTV: The Comedy Network, which began airing on April 1, 1991; prior to the merger, both channels each had fewer than 10 million subscribers. Because of confusion and possible legal issues with the Canadian-based CTV network, the name of the network was subsequently changed to Comedy Central. The name "Comedy Partners, Inc." appears on the end credits of all shows produced by the new channel. The original Viacom (not the current one, of which Comedy Central is currently part) bought out Time Warner's (which had belonged to HBO, which operated The Comedy Channel) half of the network in 2003; despite this, the "Comedy Partners, Inc." byline still appears on shows produced by the channel today.

Original programming

Acquired programming

References 

Comedy Central
Defunct television networks in the United States
Television channels and stations established in 1990
Television channels and stations disestablished in 1991